Currant Creek may refer to:

 Currant Creek (Juab and Utah counties, Utah)
 A creek in Currant, Nevada
 Currant Creek Dam (Utah), including the river Currant Creek and the Currant Creek Reservoir in Wasatch County
 Currant Creek Pass, a mountain pass in the Front Range of Colorado